California Pizza Kitchen (CPK) is an American casual dining restaurant chain that specializes in California-style pizza.  The restaurant was started in 1985 by attorneys Rick Rosenfield and Larry Flax in Beverly Hills, California, United States.

Description 

The California Pizza Kitchen chain is widely known for its innovative and nontraditional pizzas, such as the "Original BBQ Chicken Pizza",  Thai Chicken, and Jamaican Jerk Chicken pizzas. They also serve various kinds of pasta, salads, soups, sandwiches, and desserts.  They have an extensive children's menu for children ages 10 and under which includes a variety of different pizzas, pastas, salad, and chicken.

The chain has over 250 locations in 32 U.S. states and 10 other countries, including 15 California Pizza Kitchen nontraditional, franchise concepts designed for airports, universities, and stadiums.

CPK's brand is licensed to a line of hand-tossed style, crispy thin crust, gluten-free crust, and small frozen pizzas for sale in supermarkets. The brand was originally licensed to Kraft in 1999. The license was assigned to Nestlé after it purchased Kraft's pizza lines in 2010.

History

In 1985, Flax and Rosenfield pooled $200,000 in bank loans and savings along with $350,000 invested from friends to lease space on Beverly Drive in Beverly Hills, California. The first menu, including the famous BBQ Chicken Pizza, was developed by Ed LaDou, then the pizza chef at Wolfgang Puck's Spago restaurant. CPK became an immediate success, and the company expanded throughout Southern California. By 1992, there were 26 CPKs.

Flax and Rosenfield served as co-CEO and co-Chairmen of CPK from 1985 through to 1996.

In 1992, PepsiCo paid nearly $100 million for 67% of the chain, with Flax and Rosenfield each receiving $17.5 million. At the time, this was thought to be more than CPK was worth, and PepsiCo pushed to expand faster. CPK opened 15 stores in 1993, and then 28 more in the following year. This rapid expansion plan was a disaster. PepsiCo had invested tens of millions of dollars and quickly slowed expansion, and moved to cut costs. PepsiCo executives had started cutting corners by replacing fresh ingredients with frozen vegetables and cheese, a change Flax and Rosenfield later reversed.

In 1997, the private equity firm Bruckmann, Rosser, Sherrill & Company bought out PepsiCo's two-thirds stake with the intention of taking CPK public in 2000, pushing for expansion to resume. Veteran restaurant executive Fred Hipp was hired to run CPK with an aggressive expansion plan, including 18 new stores in 2002, 22 in 2003, and 28 in 2004. The expansion was to be carried out by former Brinker International Vice President Tom Jenneman, under the title of chief development officer. Flax and Rosenfield remained on the board, but had no day-to-day control.

In early 2003, CPK reported a 16% increase in profits, with Hipp telling analysts that CPK was in excellent financial condition. In a March 25, 2003, press release, CPK cut its first-quarter earnings estimates, which were not consistent with the forecast made just a few weeks earlier. Rosenfield investigated the numbers and discovered the positive earnings numbers Hipp had been touting were masking difficult quarters ahead. An emergency board meeting was called, Hipp and Jenneman were fired, and Flax and Rosenfield resumed control of CPK.

Flax and Rosenfield served as co-CEO and co-chairmen of CPK from 2003 to 2011. In 2011, CPK was acquired by an affiliate of private equity firm Golden Gate Capital, and G. J. Hart was named president, chief executive officer, and executive chairman.

In 2013, CPK started serving Gluten Intolerance Group (GIG) certified gluten-free pizzas, available across all CPK locations, excluding franchise locations.

In 2014, CPK started rolling out their "Next Chapter" locations, with modernized interiors and updated menus.

In 2018, CPK added Cauliflower Pizza Crust to its menu nationwide.

In July 2020, CPK filed for bankruptcy due to the COVID-19 pandemic. Owner Golden Gate Capital LP had acquired the company in 2011 and lost 100% of its investment. In October 2020, the sale of the company's assets was cancelled because no party submitted a qualified bid by the sale deadline. The company emerged from bankruptcy in November 2020, with significantly less debt, and hired a new CFO, Judd Tirnauer. In mid-2021, it reportedly hired advisors to refinance its remaining $177 million debt, which would put it in a better position for either a sale or an IPO.

Countries of operation
Australia
Chile
Costa Rica
Guam
Hong Kong
India
Japan
Mexico
Philippines
Singapore
South Korea
United Arab Emirates
United States
Canada

See also
 List of pizza chains of the United States

References

External links

Pizza chains of the United States
Pizza franchises
Restaurants established in 1985
Restaurants in Los Angeles
Companies based in Beverly Hills, California
Restaurants in California
Restaurant chains in the United States
Private equity portfolio companies
Cuisine of the Western United States
Pizzerias in the United States
Former PepsiCo subsidiaries
Companies formerly listed on the Nasdaq
1985 establishments in California
American companies established in 1985
2000 initial public offerings
2011 mergers and acquisitions
Companies that filed for Chapter 11 bankruptcy in 2020